Tom Starling (born 4 June 1998) is an Australian professional rugby league footballer who plays as a  for the Canberra Raiders in the NRL.

He previously played for the Newcastle Knights in the National Rugby League.

Background
Starling was born in Windsor, New South Wales, Australia. Starling is of Irish heritage.  

He played his junior rugby league for the Kincumber Colts, before being signed by the Newcastle Knights.

Playing career

Early years
In June 2015, Starling won the Newcastle Knights Carlson Club-Andrew Johns Medal for best under-18s player. In September 2015, he won the S. G. Ball Cup Player of the Year award for best under-18s player. From 2015 to 2017, he played for the Newcastle Knights' National Youth Competition team. In September 2017, he re-signed with Newcastle on a one-year contract until the end of 2018.

2018
In 2018, Starling alternated between the new Jersey Flegg Cup competition and Intrust Super Premiership NSW competition for the Knights. In round 25 of the 2018 NRL season, he made his NRL debut for the Newcastle Knights against the St. George Illawarra Dragons. He parted ways with the Newcastle club at the end of the season.

2019
In 2019, Starling joined the Canberra Raiders as a development player. In round 12, he was granted an exemption by the NRL to join the top squad as a player outside of the top 30 due to the Raiders' injury toll and players missing to State of Origin. He made his debut for Canberra off the interchange bench against the Canterbury-Bankstown Bulldogs, with Canberra winning 12-10.

Starling spent most of the year playing for Canberra's feeder club side Mounties in the Canterbury Cup NSW competition.  Starling played in Mounties elimination final loss against Newtown at Campbelltown Stadium.

2020
Starling had a breakout year in 2020 after starting hooker Josh Hodgson went down with a season ending ACL injury. Starling entered the first grade side from round 10 onwards, rotating as the starting hooker with Siliva Havili and was instrumental in Canberra's run to the finals.  Starling played in all three finals games for Canberra including the preliminary final loss to Melbourne.

Starling was rewarded for his stellar season with a two-year extension to keep him at the Canberra club until the end of 2022.

2021
In round 22 of the 2021 NRL season, Starling suffered a broken jaw in Canberra's loss against Melbourne.  He was later ruled out for an indefinite period.

He played a total of 19 games for Canberra in the 2021 NRL season which saw the club finish 10th on the table and miss out on the finals.

2022
Starling featured in every game for Canberra in the 2022 NRL season as the club finished 8th on the table and qualified for the finals.  Starling played in both finals matches as Canberra were eliminated in the second week by Parramatta.

Controversy
On 5 December 2020, Starling was arrested and charged with assaulting police after a fight broke out at the Shady Palms Bar Restaurant in Kincumber on the Central Coast. Starling was reportedly charged with five counts of assaulting an officer in the execution of duty, affray and resisting arrest.

On 21 January 2021, Starling had six of the seven charges against him dropped.

On 20 October 2021, it was reported by the media that Starling had been arrested by NSW Police after an altercation at a Central Coast Bar.  Starling was charged with threatening or causing injury to potential juror or witness and behaving in offensive manner in or near public place or school.  Starling was granted conditional bail to appear at Gosford Local Court on January 11 2022.

References

External links

Canberra Raiders profile
Newcastle Knights profile

1998 births
Living people
Australian rugby league players
Canberra Raiders players
Newcastle Knights players
Rugby league hookers
Rugby league players from Windsor, New South Wales